The Ministry of Indigenous Affairs (formally called Ministry of Indigenous Relations and Reconciliation) is the Government of Ontario ministry responsible for issues relating to First Nations, Métis and Inuit in Ontario. The current Minister of Indigenous Affairs is Hon. Greg Rickford who sits in the Executive Council of Ontario or cabinet.

History

From 1981 to 1985, indigenous issues were mainly the responsibilities of the Attorney General and the Provincial Secretary for Resources Development (as Chair of the Cabinet Committee on Native Affairs).

In June 1985, Premier David Peterson designated a minister responsible for "native affairs" for the first time in Ontario history.

In 1987, the Ontario Native Affairs Directorate was established. It was renamed the Ontario Native Affairs Secretariat in 1991. The entity acted as a support for the Minister Responsible for Native Affairs, and was headed by an Executive Director and later a Secretary, who for the most part held the rank of Assistant Deputy Attorney General. Andromache Karakatsanis, later Supreme Court Justice, held this role between 1995-97. In 2006, the Secretariat's name was changed to the Ontario Aboriginal Affairs Secretariat.

In June 2007, the standalone Ministry of Aboriginal Affairs replaced the Secretariat. In June 2016, the ministry was renamed the Ministry of Indigenous Relations and Reconciliation as part of Ontario's response to the Truth and Reconciliation Commission of Canada's 2015 Report. In June 2018, the ministry was renamed the Ministry of Indigenous Affairs.

The mandate of the ministry is to:
promote collaboration and coordination across ministries on Aboriginal policy and programs;
set priorities for and track the progress of Ontario's Aboriginal agenda;
enhance government's awareness of Aboriginal people, issues and best practices for consulting and engaging with Aboriginal people;
work with the federal government to find ways to make the most of federal funding;
help Aboriginal people to access Ontario government programs, services and information;
reform the land claims process to help address historical grievances; and
encourage diversity, especially representation of Aboriginal people, in the Ontario Public Service.

The ministry has four key priorities:
Stronger Indigenous Relationships;
Improved Social Conditions;
Economic Opportunity and Sustainability; and
Enhanced Land Claim Settlements and Reconciliation.

Land Claims

One of the most divisive issues with the public has been land claims. MIA has been mandated to reform the land claim process and current land claims tend to be negotiated with the Native Reserves, with the public excluded, and proposed settlements are then presented to the public for their acceptance. Currently there is no independent body that represents the public in native land claims. Public concerns and evidence may have been ignored when it differed from proposed settlements but the public is expected to go along with negotiated settlement agreements.

Organization
 Minister's Office
 Deputy Minister's Office
 Negotiations and Reconciliation Division
 Aboriginal Relations and Ministry Partnerships Division
 Strategic Policy and Planning Division
 Legal Services Branch
 Communications Branch
 Corporate Management Division

2011-2012 Results-based Plan

List of Ministers

Related links 
 Ontario Ministry of Indigenous Relations and Reconciliation  
 Indian and Northern Affairs Canada - Canadian federal government branch

External links
 Ontario Ministry of Indigenous Relations and Reconciliation

2007 establishments in Ontario
Indigenous Relations and Reconciliation
Ministries established in 2007
First Nations in Ontario
Ontario